Lucila may refer to:

Lucila Godey Alcaya (1889–1957), known as Gabriela Mistral, Chilean poet-diplomat, educator and humanist
Lucila Gallegos Camarena (born 1961), Mexican politician from the National Action Party
Lucila Campos (1938–2016), Peruvian singer known as "la Morena Espectáculo" and "Reina de las Polladas"
Lucila Luciani de Pérez Díaz (1882–1971), Venezuelan historian, musician and feminist
Lucila Garfias (born 1951), Mexican politician affiliated with the PANAL
Lucila Rubio de Laverde, Colombian socialist and one of the leading suffragettes in her country
Lucila Gamero de Medina (1873–1964), Honduran romantic novelist
Lucila Palacios (Mercedes Carvajal de Arocha) (1902–1994), Trinidadian—Venezuelan writer, politician and diplomat
Lucila Pascua (born 1983), Spanish basketball center
Lucila Pini (1930–1974), Brazilian sprinter
Leona Lucila Vidal Roberts (born 1972), Falkland Islands curator, radio broadcaster and politician
María Lucila Beltrán Ruiz (1932–1996), known as Lola Beltrán, Mexican singer, actress, and television presenter
Lucila Salao (born 1954), Filipino sprinter
Lucila Vianna da Silva (born 1976), Brazilian handball player
Lucila Santos Trujillo (1925–1984), First Lady of Ecuador to Otto Arosemena from 1966 to 1968

See also
La Lucila, town of the Vicente López Partido in the northern suburbs of Greater Buenos Aires, Argentina
La Lucila del Mar, town in the La Costa Partido of the Province of Buenos Aires, Argentina
Lucilia (disambiguation)
Lucilina
Lucilla
Luciola

es:Lucila